Luv Text is a 2001 Philippine romantic comedy film directed by Rowell Santiago. The film stars Judy Ann Santos and Wowie de Guzman. This is the first film produced by Maverick Films after being acquired by a group of investors when it was called Millennium Cinema.

Cast
 Judy Ann Santos as Melissa
 Nida Blanca as Cielito
 Karen Navarrete as Young Cielito
 Wowie de Guzman as Banjo
 Carlo Muñoz as Pablo
 Joonee Gamboa as Nanding
 Luis Alandy as Young Nanding
 Wilma Doesn't as Ebony
 Russell C. Mon as Ivan
 Mel Kimura as Ms. Asuncion
 Manuel Aquino as Debate Class Professor
 Jenny Rances as Tricia
 Iyan Adewuya as Angel
 Gloria Tenchavez as Soling
 Rowell Santiago as Ryan

References

External links

2001 films
2001 romantic comedy films
Filipino-language films
Philippine romantic comedy films
Maverick Films films